The West Virginia Department of Health and Human Resources (WVDHHR or more commonly DHHR) is a government agency of the U.S. state of West Virginia. The department administers the state's health, social, and welfare programs.  In 2023, the West Virginia Legislature passed H.B. 2006, that dissolves the DHHR and replaces it with three new agencies effective January 1, 2024. Governor Jim Justice signed the bill into law on March 4, 2023.

References

External links
 

State departments of health of the United States
State agencies of West Virginia
Medical and health organizations based in West Virginia